The 2010–11 Missouri Valley Conference men's basketball season marks the 102nd season of Missouri Valley Conference basketball.

Preseason

Missouri Valley preseason poll

Missouri Valley preseason All-Conference team
Kwadzo Ahelegbe (Northern Iowa)
Kenny Lawson, Jr. (Creighton)
Sam Maniscalco (Bradley) 
Toure Murry (Wichita State)
Kyle Weems (Missouri State)

Awards & honors

Missouri Valley All-Conference teams

References